is a retired Japanese freestyle wrestler. He won gold medals in the 52 kg category at the 1964 Summer Olympics.

Born in Hokkaido, Yoshida graduated from the Nihon University in Tokyo. After retiring from wrestling he left sport and worked for Meiji Dairies, eventually joining its board of directors.

Yoshikatsu Yoshida (吉田義勝) is often confused with Eikatsu Yoshida (吉田栄勝), a former national champion, and wrestling coach.

References

External links

 
 

1941 births
Living people
Olympic wrestlers of Japan
Wrestlers at the 1964 Summer Olympics
Japanese male sport wrestlers
Olympic gold medalists for Japan
People from Asahikawa
Olympic medalists in wrestling
Medalists at the 1964 Summer Olympics
20th-century Japanese people
21st-century Japanese people